The Doll Squad is a 1973 low-budget Z-grade action film by Feature-Faire that was later re-released under the title Seduce and Destroy. Directed, edited, co-written and co-produced by Ted V. Mikels, it features Francine York, Michael Ansara, John Carter, Anthony Eisley, Leigh Christian and Tura Satana. Mikels claimed he filmed it for a total cost of $256,000.

Plot
CIA operative Connolly assigns Sabrina, the leader of a group of five shapely female operatives individually selected by a computer. Code named the Doll Squad, they thwart the efforts of a madman who formerly worked alongside Sabrina as a fellow CIA agent who has become an entrepreneur to overthrow world governments. His plan is to release rats infected with bubonic plague.

Cast 

Michael Ansara as Eamon O'Reilly
Francine York as Sabrina Kincaid
Anthony Eisley as Victor Connelly
John Carter as Senator Stockwell
Tura Satana as Lavelle Sumara
Lisa Todd as Maria
Rafael Campos as Rafael
Lillian Garrett as Nancy Malone
William Bagdad as Joseph
Herb Robins as Munson
Curt Matson as Captain Curran
Christopher Augustine
Bertil Unger as Mr. Cahaymen
Gustaf Unger as Dr. Cahaymen
Richard Reed
William Bonano
Judith McConnell as Elizabeth White
Jean London as Kim Duval
Sherri Vernon as Cat

Production
Mikels said the script was brought to him by Pam Eddy and Jack Richesin: "It was three kind of naughty girls of the night getting together to take vengeance against somebody that did something to them. It evolved deeper and deeper, I did two or three re-writes on it, and finally the wife of Joseph Robertson did the final draft". Mikels said that Mary Martin and Sissy Spacek came in for parts but the roles had already been cast: "I'm very pleased with everybody I had in it though. That turned out to be a forerunner of female power films".

Time Inc. contributor Ed White notes that the visuals for the action sequences near the end of the film are unusually dark. This part of the film was shot in a single night. The multiple submachine guns used by the actresses in this sequence were really a single weapon that was on temporarily loan to the director.

Reception 
DVD reviewer and Rolling Stone contributor Doug Pratt called it "an enjoyable action romp". He adds, "the girls kick some serious butt and they look terrific in their hot black jumpsuits. Who can resist?" Film critic Michael Adams said the film is "so slow in parts I think it should be called The Dull Squad", but "it picks up at the end". He rated it a solid 37/100. Nonetheless, it has become something of a cult film for fans of actress Francine York.

Influence 
This film may have been the inspiration for the Charlie's Angels television series. Aaron Spelling, who later produced the television series, and at the time was executive producer of Mod Squad, was invited to the premiere of this film, and the lead member of the squad was named Sabrina, just as in Charlie's Angels. Quentin Tarantino said the women in the film have a similar look to his Deadly Viper Assassination Squad in his film Kill Bill.

See also
 List of American films of 1973

References

External links

1973 films
1970s spy action films
American spy thriller films
Films shot in California
Girls with guns films
Fictional female martial artists
Films directed by Ted V. Mikels
1970s English-language films
1970s American films